Dynamiden op. 173 is a Viennese Waltz composed by Josef Strauss in 1865. 
Its subtitle is Geheime Anziehungskräfte ('Mysterious Powers of Magnetism').

Richard Strauss used this waltz to his comic opera Der Rosenkavalier.

Waltz 1

Vienna New Year's Concert 
The advent of the Vienna New Year's Concertis as follows.
1949 – Clemens Krauss
1967 – Willi Boskovsky
1971 – Willi Boskovsky
1997 – Riccardo Muti
2007 – Zubin Mehta
2014 – Daniel Barenboim
2020 - Andris Nelsons

External links

Compositions by Josef Strauss
Waltzes
1865 compositions